Gustavo Ibáñez (born July 30, 1979 in Tucuman, Argentina) is an Argentine association football Forward currently playing for Juventud Antoniana.

Teams
  San Martín de Tucumán 2002–2006
  Quilmes 2006–2007
  San Martín de Tucumán 2007–2008
  Municipal Iquique 2009
  San Martín de Tucumán 2010–2014
  Juventud Antoniana 2014–

References
 

1979 births
Living people
Argentine footballers
Argentine expatriate footballers
San Martín de Tucumán footballers
Quilmes Atlético Club footballers
Deportes Iquique footballers
Expatriate footballers in Chile
Association football forwards
Sportspeople from Tucumán Province